Deep River Waterpark is a seasonal summer outdoor water park that operates from Memorial Day weekend through Labor Day, and winter ice skating rink operated by the Lake County Parks and Recreation Department in Crown Point, Indiana. Deep River Water Park features 14 attractions and is the second largest publicly owned waterpark in the USA.

Amusement parks in Indiana